Malice n Wonderland is the tenth studio album by American rapper Snoop Dogg; it was released on December 8, 2009, by  Doggystyle Records, Capitol Records and Priority Records. Production for the album took place from January 2009 to September 2009 at several recording studios and the production was handled by Battlecat, The-Dream, Tricky Stewart, The Neptunes, Teddy Riley, Lil Jon and Terrace Martin.

The album debuted at number 23 on the US Billboard 200 chart, selling 61,000 copies in its first week. Upon its release, Malice n Wonderland received generally mixed to positive reviews from music critics.

Background
The album was originally planned to be released through a distribution deal with MTV, after his departure with Interscope Records. In 2009, Priority Records announced that Snoop Dogg was appointed creative chairman of Priority Records and the label also announced plans to release his tenth studio album on the label.

The album consists of fourteen tracks and features production from Teddy Riley,  Nottz, The Neptunes, The-Dream, and Terrace Martin. Guest features include R. Kelly, Soulja Boy Tell 'Em, and Brandy.

Doggystyle Records president and Snoopadelic Films president Ted Chung, Snoop shooting a mini-movie to accompany the album (similar to his 1994 short film/soundtrack Murder Was the Case), portraying him as a "super gangster".

Reception

Malice n Wonderland was received with generally mixed to positive reviews, with Metacritic giving it 61 out of 100. The Smoking Section said "[Snoop's] one-of-a-kind flow and the knowledge of how to actually craft an enjoyable record will likely continue to serve as one of premiere blueprints in Hip-Hop."

Singles
"Gangsta Luv" featuring The-Dream, was released as the album's lead single on October 6, 2009. The song was produced by American producers, The-Dream and Tricky Stewart, one of two such productions on the album.

The album's second single "That's tha Homie", was released for digital download on November 3, 2009.

The album's third single "I Wanna Rock" was released for digital download on November 17, 2009.

The album's fourth single, "Pronto" featuring Soulja Boy, was released for digital download on December 1, 2009.

Promotion
Snoop Dogg hosted WWE Raw on October 19, 2009 to promote Malice n Wonderland.

Commercial performance 
Malice n Wonderland debuted at number 23 on the US Billboard 200, selling 61,000 copies in its opening week. It is his first album since Paid tha Cost to Be da Boss (2002) not to reach the top ten on the Billboard 200, his lowest charting album on the US R&B/Hip-Hop charts and his only album to miss the British and Australian Top 100. Malice n Wonderland has sold over 400,000 copies in the United States as of 2011.

Track listing
Credits adapted from the album's liner notes.

 (co.) Co-producer

Sample credits
 "I Wanna Rock" contains elements and samples from "It Takes Two" as performed by Rob Base and DJ E-Z Rock and "Think About It" as performed by Lyn Collins.
 "Secrets" contains interpolations from "Talking in Your Sleep" as performed by The Romantics.
 "Pimpin Ain't EZ" elements and samples from "Zoom" as performed by The Commodores.

Personnel 
Credits for Malice n Wonderland adapted from Allmusic.

Musicians 

 Misty Anderson - background vocals
 Bokie - vocals
 Soulja Boy - vocals
 Brandy - vocals
 Shante Broadus - vocals, background vocals
 Dee Dimes - background vocals
 DJ Ez Dick - vocals
 Bryce Doherty - background vocals
 The-Dream - vocals, producer
 Eric Eylands - background vocals
 Andrew Gouche - bass
 Dustin Hess - bass guitar
 Nipsey Hussle - vocals
 Holli Joyce Ivory - background vocals
 R. Kelly - vocals

 Kokane - vocals
 Trevor Lawrence - percussion
 Cha'nelle Lewis - background vocals
 Bokie Loc - vocals
 Terrace Martin - accordion, arranger, keyboards, mixing, producer, saxophone
 Rona Mercado - background vocals
 Problem - vocals
 Kevin Randolph - keyboards
 Tricky Stewart - producer
 T'yana Shani Stewart - background vocals
 Jazmine Sullivan - vocals
 Marlon Williams - guitar
 Pharrell Williams - vocals
 Mansur Zafr - keyboards

Production 

 Lucky Alvarez - design, layout
 Marcella "Ms. Lago" Araica - mixing
 B-Don - producer
 Jason Bale - assistant engineer
 Battlecat - mixing, producer
 Mike Bozzi - assistant
 Aaron "A-Game" Brunson - keyboard programming
 Smith Carlson - assistant
 Ted Chung - assistant, engineer
 Andrew Coleman - digital editing, engineer
 Danja - producer
 Scoop DeVille - producer
 Dr. Dre - mixing
 Shon Don - engineer
 Caliph Gamble - engineer
 Brian Gardner - mastering
 Abel Garibaldi - engineer
 Tasha Hayward - hair stylist
 Mauricio Iragorri - mixing
 Chris Jackson - A&R, engineer
 Jaycen Joshua - mixing
 Sam Kalandijan - engineer
 Justin Keitt - engineer, vocal arrangement
 Keke - production coordination
 Kori Lewis - assistant
 Justin Li - A&R
 Lil Jon - vocals, mixing, producer
 Giancarlo Lino - mixing assistant
 Deborah Mannis-Gardner - sample clearance

 Fabian Marasciullo - mixing
 Jason Martin - producer
 Ian Mereness - engineer
 Mister Cartoon - cover art
 Luis Navarro - assistant engineer
 The Neptunes - producer
 Nottz - producer
 Estevan Oriol - photography and design
 Erik "Mr. E." Ramos - engineer
 Erik Reichers - mixing
 Robert Reyes - assistant engineer
 Teddy Riley - producer
 Ramon Rivas - assistant
 April Roomet - wardrobe
 Marcus Rutledge - engineer
 Edward "Poeted" Sanders Jr. - assistant
 Constance Schwartz - marketing
 Ray Seay - mixing
 Kelly Sheehan - engineer
 Brent Smith - booking
 Snoop Dogg - arranger, executive producer, primary artist, producer
 Ethan Sugar - engineer
 Super Ced - drum programming, producer
 Brian "B-Luv" Thomas - engineer
 Pat Thrall - engineer
 Frank Vasquez - engineer
 Mark Vinten - engineer
 Andrew Wuepper - engineer

Charts

Weekly charts

Year-end charts

Certifications and sales

References

External links

2009 albums
Snoop Dogg albums
Albums produced by Battlecat (producer)
Albums produced by Danja (record producer)
Albums produced by Lil Jon
Albums produced by Nottz
Albums produced by Scoop DeVille
Albums produced by Teddy Riley
Albums produced by Terrace Martin
Albums produced by Tricky Stewart
Albums produced by The-Dream
Albums produced by the Neptunes
Priority Records albums
Doggystyle Records albums